There are over 20,000 Grade II* listed buildings in England.  This page is a list of these buildings in Harborough, to the southeast of Leicester.

Harborough

|}

See also
Grade II* listed buildings in Leicestershire
Grade I listed buildings in Leicestershire

Notes

External links

 Harborough
listed buildings
Harborough District